Jan Egon Karlsson (born 15 November 1945) is a retired Swedish wrestler, who often competed both in Greco-Roman and freestyle divisions at the same championships. In this way he won two medals each at the 1972 Olympic Games and 1973 World Senior Championships. He remains the last wrestler to win a medal in both styles in the same Olympic Games.

References

External links

1945 births
Living people
Olympic wrestlers of Sweden
Wrestlers at the 1968 Summer Olympics
Wrestlers at the 1972 Summer Olympics
Wrestlers at the 1976 Summer Olympics
Swedish male sport wrestlers
Olympic silver medalists for Sweden
Olympic bronze medalists for Sweden
Olympic medalists in wrestling
World Wrestling Championships medalists
Medalists at the 1972 Summer Olympics
European Wrestling Championships medalists
People from Trollhättan
Sportspeople from Västra Götaland County
20th-century Swedish people